The Great Train Robbery may refer to:

 Great Train Robbery (1963), of £2.6 million from a British train
 Great Gold Robbery, of gold worth £12,000 from a British train in 1855

Film and television

 The Great Train Robbery (1903 film), a 1903 American silent short Western film.
 The Great K & A Train Robbery, a 1926 American Western silent film.
 The Great Train Robbery (1941 film), a 1941 American low-budget crime-western.
 "The Great Train Robbery", an episode of I Love Lucy, 1955.
The Great St Trinian's Train Robbery, the 1966 fourth film of the St Trinians film saga.
 The First Great Train Robbery, a 1978 film, released in the U.S. as The Great Train Robbery, directed by Michael Crichton, based on his novel'
 Old 587: The Great Train Robbery, a Film in 2000 that involves Nickel Plate Road No. 587 and where a group of children try many attempts to save the 587 from being scrapped and donate it to a museum with the help of the Engine's driver and his dog.
 The Great Train Robbery (2013 TV series).

Other uses
 The Great Train Robbery (board game), a 1970s board game based on the Great Train Robbery (1963)
 The Great Train Robbery (novel), a 1975 historical novel by Michael Crichton, about the Great Gold Robbery (1855)
 "Great Train Robbery" (song), by Black Uhuru, 1986
 "The Great Train Robbery", a song/tune by Mountain on their 1971 album Nantucket Sleighride

See also
Train robbery